Totnes is a parliamentary constituency in Devon represented in the House of Commons of the UK Parliament since December 2019 by Anthony Mangnall, a Conservative. Mangnall defeated incumbent Sarah Wollaston who had originally been elected as a Conservative but defected to the Liberal Democrats earlier that year.

History
The current constituency was formed for the 1997 general election, from parts of the former South Hams constituency.  This had, in 1983, largely replaced the previous Totnes constituency, which had existed in a wide form since 1885, but in a much narrower form from the Model Parliament.

An original parliamentary borough of Totnes or Totness had been created in 1295. It returned two MPs to the House of Commons of England until 1707, then to the House of Commons of Great Britain until 1800, and finally to the House of Commons of the United Kingdom from 1801 until it was abolished under the Representation of the People Act 1867 with effect from the 1868 election.

Political history
The modern constituency has returned Conservatives in general elections since its 1997 recreation, which suggests a safe seat, though it came close to falling to the Liberal Democrats in 1997. Its Conservative MP since 2010, Dr. Sarah Wollaston, defected to the Liberal Democrats in 2019, after a brief spell as an independent, and prior to that as a member of Change UK, a new party formed from MPs formerly Conservative or Labour, after she became disillusioned with the Conservative Party's position on Brexit. She came second to a new Conservative candidate in 2019.

During the 2016 EU Referendum, Totnes is estimated to have narrowly voted to Leave, by 53.9% vs. 46.1% Remain. Although the town of Totnes itself is a Remain stronghold, the rural areas of the constituency voted in favour of Brexit.

Boundaries 	

1885–1918: The Municipal Borough of Totnes, and the Sessional Divisions of Ermington and Plympton, and Stanborough and Coleridge.

1918–1950: The Municipal Borough of Totnes, the Urban Districts of Ashburton, Buckfastleigh, Kingsbridge, Newton Abbot, Salcombe, and Teignmouth, the Rural District of Kingsbridge, and parts of the Rural Districts of Newton Abbot and Totnes.

1950–1974: The Municipal Boroughs of Clifton, Dartmouth, Hardness, and Totnes, the Urban Districts of Ashburton, Buckfastleigh, Kingsbridge, Newton Abbot, and Salcombe, the Rural Districts of Kingsbridge and Newton Abbot, and part of the Rural District of Totnes.

1974–1983: The Municipal Boroughs of Clifton, Dartmouth, Hardness, and Totnes, the Urban Districts of Ashburton, Buckfastleigh, Kingsbridge, Newton Abbot, and Salcombe, and the Rural Districts of Kingsbridge, Newton Abbot, and Totnes.

1997–2010: The District of South Hams wards of Avon and Harbourne, Avonleigh, Dartington, Dartmouth Clifton, Dartmouth Hardness, Dart Valley, Eastmoor, Garabrook, Kingsbridge, Kingswear, Malborough, Marldon, Salcombe, Saltstone, Skerries, South Brent, Stoke Gabriel, Stokenham, Thurlestone, Totnes, Totnes Bridgetown, and West Dart, the Borough of Torbay wards of Blatchcombe, Furzeham with Churston, and St Peter's with St Mary's, and the District of Teignbridge wards of Ambrook, Ashburton, and Buckfastleigh.

2010–present: The District of South Hams wards of Allington and Loddiswell, Avon and Harbourne, Dartington, Dartmouth and Kingswear, Dartmouth Townstal, East Dart, Eastmoor, Kingsbridge East, Kingsbridge North, Marldon, Salcombe and Malborough, Saltstone, Skerries, South Brent, Stokenham, Thurlestone, Totnes Bridgetown, Totnes Town, West Dart, and Westville and Alvington, and the Borough of Torbay wards of Berry Head with Furzeham, Blatchcombe, Churston with Galmpton, and St Mary's with Summercombe.

The Totnes constituency covers the eastern part of the South Hams district of Devon, including the towns of Totnes, Dartmouth, Kingsbridge and Salcombe, as well as parts of the unitary authority of Torbay, including the town of Brixham.

Constituency profile

The seat covers the undulating Totnes area in south Devon, which also includes the towns of Brixham, South, and Western Paignton which is in Torbay.  Workless claimants, registered jobseekers,  were in November 2012 significantly lower than the national average of 3.8%, at 2.4% of the population based on a statistical compilation by The Guardian.

Members of Parliament

MPs 1295–1660
Constituency created 1295

MPs 1660–1868
Two members

MPs 1885–1983
One member

MPs since 1997
Between 1983 and 1997 the constituency was replaced by the South Hams constituency. Anthony Steen was returned at every election.

Elections

Elections in the 2010s

Elections in the 2000s

Elections in the 1990s

Elections in the 1970s

Elections in the 1960s

Elections in the 1950s

Elections in the 1940s

Elections in the 1930s
General Election 1939–40:
Another General Election was required to take place before the end of 1940. The political parties had been making preparations for an election to take place and by the Autumn of 1939, the following candidates had been selected; 
Conservative: Ralph Rayner
Liberal: F Vernon Baxter

Elections in the 1920s

Election results 1885-1918

Elections in the 1910s 

General Election 1914–15:

Another General Election was required to take place before the end of 1915. The political parties had been making preparations for an election to take place and by July 1914, the following candidates had been selected; 
Unionist: Francis Mildmay
Liberal: Robert Dunstan

Elections in the 1880s

Elections in the 1900s

Elections in the 1890s

Election results 1832-1868

Elections in the 1860s 

 

On petition, Pender was unseated on 22 March 1866. No writ was issued to replace him and, in 1868, the seat was disenfranchised and absorbed into South Devon.

By-election caused by the death of George Hay.

By-election caused by the death of Thomas Mills.

Elections in the 1850s

 
 

 
 
 

By-election caused by Edward Seymour becoming 12th Duke of Somerset.

 
 

Seymour was appointed Commissioner of Woods, Forests, Land Revenues, Works, and Buildings, requiring a by-election.

Elections in the 1840s

 587
 

 

 

The previous by-election was declared void on petition, causing a by-election.

Elections in the 1830s

 

 Caused by Parrott's resignation. This by-election was later declared void.

 
 

 Caused by Seymour's appointment as a Lord Commissioner of the Treasury

 

 

 Caused by Cornish's resignation

See also 
 List of parliamentary constituencies in Devon

Notes

References

Parliamentary constituencies in Devon
Constituencies of the Parliament of the United Kingdom established in 1295
Constituencies of the Parliament of the United Kingdom disestablished in 1868
Constituencies of the Parliament of the United Kingdom established in 1885
Constituencies of the Parliament of the United Kingdom disestablished in 1983
Constituencies of the Parliament of the United Kingdom established in 1997
Parliamentary constituencies disenfranchised for corruption
Totnes